Anthony Meredith Quinton, Baron Quinton, FBA (25 March 192519 June 2010) was a British political and moral philosopher, metaphysician, and materialist philosopher of mind. He served as President of Trinity College, Oxford from 1978 to 1987; and as chairman of the board of the British Library from 1985 to 1990. He is also remembered as a presenter of the BBC Radio programme, Round Britain Quiz.

Life
Quinton was born at 5, Seaton Road, Gillingham, Kent. He was the only son of Surgeon Captain Richard Frith Quinton, Royal Navy (1889–1935) and his wife (Gwenllyan) Letitia (née Jones).

He was educated at Stowe School and Christ Church, Oxford, where he got a first-class honours degree in Philosophy, Politics and Economics. A fellow of All Souls from 1948, he became a Fellow of New College, Oxford, in 1955. He was President of Trinity College, Oxford, from 1978 to 1987.

Quinton was president of the Aristotelian Society from 1975 to 1976. He was chairman of the board of the British Library from 1985 to 1990.

On 7 February 1983, he was created a life peer as Baron Quinton, of Holywell in the City of Oxford and County of Oxfordshire. An admirer of Margaret Thatcher, he sat in the Lords as a Conservative.

To BBC Radio audiences, Quinton became well known as a presenter of the long-running Round Britain Quiz.

City of Benares tragedy 
In September 1940, Quinton's mother, Letitia, booked a passage for herself and 15-year-old Anthony on the passenger liner City of Benares for Canada, where her mother lived. The ship sailed on 13 September. At 10:03pm on 17 September, the ship was torpedoed by German submarine U-48 and began to sink. The Quintons were in the ship's lounge when the alarm bells rang. They went to their cabin to put on their life-jackets, collected their valuables, and returned to the lounge, which was their muster station. Eventually, Colonel James Baldwin-Webb, a British parliamentarian, decided they had waited long enough and took them to the lifeboats. The Quintons boarded Lifeboat 6, which, with roughly 65 people, was already overfull. As it was lowered, the falls and cables on one end snapped, sending the boat lurching forward, and tossing the majority of the passengers into the sea. Quinton was trapped by a heavy set woman, Mrs Anne Fleetwood-Hesketh: he clung to her, hoping her weight would keep them both from falling, but both fell into the sea. Quinton resurfaced and his mother pulled him back into the lifeboat. The boat now contained 23 people, two of whom had been rescued from another lifeboat, so that only 21 passengers of an original estimated 65 survived.

Through the night more passengers, including four children, died. By morning, only eight people, comprising five men, two women (including Mrs Quinton), and one child (Quinton himself) remained alive. Other lifeboats had suffered equally. HMS Hurricane rescued 105 survivors from the water, including Quinton and his mother. One lifeboat was adrift at sea for eight days before being rescued by another ship, which brought the survivor toll up to 148. Of the 406 people on board, 258 died (including 81 children). Quinton was one of 19 children to survive.

Metaphysics
In the debate about philosophical universals, Quinton defended a variety of nominalism that identifies properties with a set of "natural" classes. David Malet Armstrong has been strongly critical of natural class nominalism: Armstrong believes that Quinton's 'natural' classes avoid a fairly fundamental flaw with more primitive class nominalisms, namely that it has to assume that for every class you can construct, it must then have an associated property. The problem for the class nominalist according to Armstrong is that one must come up with some criteria to determine classes that back properties and those which just contain a collection of heterogeneous objects.

Quinton's version of class nominalism asserts that determining which are the natural property classes is simply a basic fact that is not open to any further philosophical scrutiny. Armstrong argues that whatever it is which picks out the natural classes is not derived from the membership of that class, but from some fact about the particular itself.

While Quinton's theory states that no further analysis of the classes is possible, he also says that some classes may be more or less natural—that is, more or less unified than another class. Armstrong illustrates this intuitive difference Quinton is appealing to by pointing to the difference between the class of coloured objects and the class of crimson objects: the crimson object class is more unified in some intuitive sense (how is not specified) than the class of coloured objects.

In Quinton's 1957 paper, he sees his theory as a less extreme version of nominalism than that of Willard van Orman Quine, Nelson Goodman and Stuart Hampshire.

Metaphilosophy

His "shortest definition of philosophy"

His longer definition

Writings 
 Spaces and Times (1962)
 Political Philosophy (editor) (1967)
 The Nature of Things (London, 1973)
 The Politics of Imperfection: The Religious and Secular Traditions of Conservative Thought in England from Hooker to Oakeshott (1978)
 Utilitarian Ethics (1973)
 Francis Bacon (Oxford, 1980)
 Thoughts and Thinkers (1982)
 "Persistence of intellectual nationalism," Perspectives on culture and society, vol. 1 (1988), 1–22
 From Wodehouse To Wittgenstein (1998)

Arms

References

External links 
Obituary in The Times
Obituary in The Guardian
 Obituary in The Daily Telegraph

1925 births
2010 deaths
20th-century British non-fiction writers
20th-century British philosophers
20th-century essayists
21st-century British non-fiction writers
21st-century British philosophers
21st-century essayists
Analytic philosophers
Aristotelian philosophers
British ethicists
British male essayists
British radio presenters
Conservative Party (UK) life peers
Epistemologists
Fellows of All Souls College, Oxford
Fellows of New College, Oxford
Fellows of the British Academy
Fellows of Trinity College, Oxford
Materialists
Metaphilosophers
Metaphysicians
Ontologists
People educated at Stowe School
People from Gillingham, Kent
Philosophers of culture
Philosophers of education
Philosophers of history
Philosophers of language
Philosophers of mind
Philosophers of religion
Philosophers of social science
Philosophy writers
Political philosophers
Presidents of the Aristotelian Society
Presidents of Trinity College, Oxford
Set theorists
Social philosophers
Life peers created by Elizabeth II